South Okanagan—West Kootenay is a federal electoral district in British Columbia. It encompasses a portion of British Columbia previously included in the electoral districts of British Columbia Southern Interior (58%), Kootenay—Columbia (3%), and Okanagan—Coquihalla (39%).

South Okanagan—West Kootenay was created by the 2012 federal electoral boundaries redistribution and was legally defined in the 2013 representation order. It came into effect upon the call of the 42nd Canadian federal election, scheduled for October 2015.

Demographics

Members of Parliament

This riding has elected the following members of the House of Commons of Canada:

Election results

Notes

References

British Columbia federal electoral districts
Castlegar, British Columbia
Penticton